Rosefin barb (Enteromius argenteus) is a species of cyprinid fish in the genus Enteromius from rivers in Angola and Namibia.

Footnotes 

 

Enteromius
Cyprinid fish of Africa
Fish described in 1868
Taxa named by Albert Günther